Howard Russell "Rusty" Clark, Jr. (February 4, 1947 – March 23, 2022) was an American-born Canadian football player who played for the Edmonton Eskimos and BC Lions. He played college football at Baylor University and the University of Houston.

Clark died on March 23, 2022, in Katy, Texas, at the age of 75.

References

1947 births
2022 deaths
Edmonton Elks players
American football quarterbacks
Canadian football quarterbacks
BC Lions players
Baylor Bears football players
Houston Cougars football players
People from Edinburg, Texas